Shri Swaminarayan Mandir, Bhuj (Devnagari: श्री स्वामिनारायण मंदिर, भुज) is a Hindu temple in Bhuj. This temple was constructed by Swaminarayan, founder of the Swaminarayan Sampradaya.

History

This mandir comes under the Narnarayan Dev Gadi. Senior devotees Gangarambhai jethi Sundarjibhai, Jigneshwarbhai and others from the Bhuj region of Kutch went to Gadhada where God Swaminarayan was attending a Fuldol festival. In that festival, the devotees of Bhuj met Swaminarayan and requested him to construct a temple in Bhuj.

God Swaminarayan asked Vaishnavananand Swami to proceed with a team of the saints to Bhuj and construct a temple. Vaishnavanand Swami and the accompanying saints went to Bhuj in 1822, camped at the place neighbouring the land of temple drew plans of the temple, complex, executed the plans with minute details and within a short span of one year, they built a temple abode of NarNarayan Dev.

Satsang in the Kutch region was spread by Late Guru Ramanand Swami. He constantly visited Bhuj and other places in Kutch.

God Swaminarayan had graced this temple in the western belt of India and had himself installed the idols of Narnarayan dev and his own form - Harikrishna Maharaj was installed in central sanctum sanctorum of the temple by Acharya Ayodyaprashadji maharaj. Besides these manifestations of God at the central dome there under the eastern dome, are seated RadhaKrishna Dev, Harikrishna Maharaj and in the western dome Ghanshyam Maharaj. Roop Chowki - the main square of the inner temple-houses the images of Ganapati and Hanuman.

Akshar Bhavan in the temple treasures the personal items of Swaminarayan that He has used in His life.

Gujarat earthquake 

The earthquake on 26 January 2001 destroyed much of the city of Bhuj, including this  temple associated with the founder of the Swaminarayan Sampraday. The saints and satsangis of Kutch residing in India and satsangis living abroad, have resolved to construct a new temple a short distance away from the site.

See also 
 Swaminarayan Temples

Notes

References

 Swaminarayan Mandirs Worldwide - Bhuj
 Shree NarNarayan Dev Nutan Mandir Mahotsav 2010 - Bhuj

External links

 Temple Official Website
 All about Swaminarayan Mandir
 Shree NarNarayan Dev Nutan Mandir Mahotsav 2010 - Bhuj

Bhuj
Swaminarayan temples in Gujarat
Tourist attractions in Kutch district